The core White House staff appointments, and most Executive Office of the President officials generally, are not required to be confirmed by the U.S. Senate, with a handful of exceptions (e.g., the director of the Office of Management and Budget, the chair and members of the Council of Economic Advisers, and the United States trade representative). There are about 4,000 positions in the Executive Office of the President.

Color key 
 Denotes appointees serving in offices that did not require Senate confirmation.

 Denotes appointees confirmed by the Senate.

 Denotes appointees awaiting Senate confirmation.

 Denotes appointees serving in an acting capacity.

 Denotes appointees who have left office or offices which have been disbanded.

 Denotes nominees who were withdrawn prior to being confirmed or assuming office.

Appointments

White House Office

Council of Economic Advisers

Council on Environmental Quality

President's Intelligence Advisory Board

Office of Management and Budget

Office of National Drug Control Policy

Office of Science and Technology Policy

Office of the United States Trade Representative

Office of the Vice President

Previous officeholders

Miscellaneous

Member of the Gulf Coast Ecosystem Restoration Council

Member of the Council of Governors

Commission on Presidential Scholars

The Alyce Spotted Bear and Wakter Soboleff Commission Native Children

President's Board of Advisors on Historically Black Colleges and Universities

President's Committee for People with Intellectual Disabilities

White House Initiative on Asian Americans and Pacific Islanders

Federal Service Impasses Panel

National Women's Business Council

United States Government Activities to Combat Malaria Globally

Previous officeholders

See also 
 Republican National Committee chairmanship election, 2017 for the national leadership of Trump's political party
 Donald Trump Supreme Court candidates for the judicial nominees to fill the vacancies formerly held by Antonin Scalia and Anthony Kennedy
 Cabinet of Donald Trump, for the vetting process undergone by top-level roles including advice and consent by the Senate
 Sr. Advisor to the President, the role formerly held by Karl Rove under George W. Bush, then by Valerie Jarrett/David Axelrod/etc under Barack Obama
 List of executive branch 'czars' e.g. Special Advisor to the President
 List of economic advisors to Donald Trump, concentrating on the informal advisors that are not officially part of the Trump administration
 List of federal judges appointed by Donald Trump
 List of short-tenure Donald Trump political appointments

Notes

References 

+
2010s politics-related lists
Lists of political office-holders in the United States
21st-century American politicians
 Executive Office
Political appointments